Henry Frederick Barrett (30 December 1879 – 18 December 1927) was a British long-distance runner who on 8 May 1909 set a world's best in only his second marathon with a time of 2:42:31 at the Polytechnic Marathon.  Barrett failed to finish the men's marathon at the 1908 Summer Olympics and 1912 Summer Olympics.

Barret was an electrician from Hounslow.

Notes

References

External links

Biography at www.olympics.org.uk

1879 births
1927 deaths
Athletes (track and field) at the 1908 Summer Olympics
Athletes (track and field) at the 1912 Summer Olympics
British male marathon runners
World record setters in athletics (track and field)
Olympic athletes of Great Britain